The Secret Millionaire is a reality television show which originated in the UK, in which millionaires go incognito into impoverished communities and agree to give away tens of thousands of pounds (or tens of thousands of dollars in the US and Australian versions). Members of the community are told the cameras are present to film a documentary. The UK version is produced by production company RDF Media. It first aired in 2006 on Channel 4, with further series in subsequent years.

Format
In each episode, a millionaire leaves his/her luxurious life behind, takes on a secret identity and lives undercover in a much much poorer area of the country for a week to ten days (in the US version, it is 6 days). Living on a limited budget (Usually less than $150) with no modern conveniences they must forge their own way in the community – working and volunteering alongside the locals and finding individuals or projects whom they think deserve a cut of their fortune. On their final day, the millionaires come clean and reveal their true identity to the people they have chosen, surprising them with gifts of thousands of pounds or US dollars to improve their lives. They must donate at least $100,000 in total. William Du was the first millionaire to donate off camera in which was not aired.

UK version

The first millionaire to appear in the series was 26-year-old Ben Way. A third series of the show began on Channel 4 on 5 August 2008. The first episode of Series 3 featured businessman James Benamor, who has been criticised in the media for investing in the sub-prime market, and sharp practice in his company the Richmond Group.

Andrew Feldman was the youngest millionaire to appear on the show at the age of 24 in the final episode of series 10 shown on 24 June 2012 and made the second largest donation a single charity had received, of £100,000, to Little Heroes; a charity that supports children with cancer.

US version

An American version of the show premiered on 3 December 2008 on Fox.

Like the British version, the Fox show features wealthy benefactors each week who go undercover in the most deprived neighbourhoods of the United States. For one week, the millionaires mingle within the community and live on a very tight budget; this being the very first time doing so for many of them. At the end of the show, the millionaires reveal their identities and proceed to donate a minimum of $100,000 (which they sometimes divide among the recipients).

Fox has aired six episodes of the hour-long series, including a two-hour premiere. The millionaires have included Internet advertising tycoon Gurbaksh Chahal; Todd and Gwen Graves, of the restaurant chain Raising Cane's Chicken Fingers; Century Software founder Gregory Haerr; DUB Magazine founders Myles and Cynthia Kovacs; attorney, broker and sportswear entrepreneur Gregory Ruzicka, and his son Cole; and Baltimore, Maryland civic leader and Baltimore Ravens NFL cheerleader Molly Shattuck.

Season one aired on FOX.  Season two consists of six hour-long episodes broadcast on ABC.

Australian version
The first season of the Australian series (listed in local TV guides as The Secret Millionaire Australia, to prevent confusion with the US version which had been broadcast earlier that year) aired in 2009 on the Nine Network. It consisted of five episodes, and was narrated by Russell Crowe; in a Herald Sun interview, Crowe discussed his work on the show and his personal approach to charity. Millionaires featured in the series included the now fugitive Albert Bertini (of failed property development firm Trivest), Derek Leddie (founder of market research firm The Leading Edge), Peter Bond (managing director of Linc Energy), Naomi Simson (founder of RedBalloon), and Danny Wallis (founder of DWS Advanced Business Solutions). A completed sixth episode was withdrawn from the broadcast schedule due to financial issues faced by the featured benefactor. More than $750,000 was given away in grants to individuals and community groups.

Season 2 first aired on Nine on Monday 23 August 2010, also narrated by Russell Crowe. Millionaires featured in the second series include Carly Crutchfield (founder/CEO of CCorp), Karl Redenbach (founder of nSynergy), Sean Ashby (founder of aussieBum), Alf & Nadia Taylor (founders/directors of TNA Solutions), Christian Beck (founder/CEO of LEAP Legal Software), and Denis McFadden (founder/CEO of Just Cuts). Episode 1 benefactor, Sydney property developer Carly Crutchfield, was the focus of a Sydney Morning Herald article discussing the return of the series. Episode 3 benefactor, Sean Ashby, was featured in an article in The Daily Telegraph regarding his involvement in the show.

Season 1: 2009

Season 2: 2010

Irish version
Annual series are produced by RTÉ since 2011 and are shown on RTÉ1 in September and October. During the year, repeats of the series have been shown on Channel 4 as Secret Millionaire Ireland.

Series 1: 2011

Series 2: 2012

Awards
The British version of Secret Millionaire won the Rose d'Or Award in 2007 for best reality series.

Secret Millionaire won the award for the best "Docu Soap" at the National Reality TV Awards for series 10 in August 2012.

See also
 The Millionaire, a fictional 1955–1960 TV series about a millionaire who gives away money.

Footnotes

External links
 Video clips at Channel 4
 Secret Millionaire  at Fox
 The Secret Millionaire  at ninemsn
 Secret Millionaire Trailer  at Fox (Viewable in the US only)
 Yahoo! News article on U.S. premiere
 
 
 Secret Millionaire on ABC Season 2
 Secret Millionaire on ABC Season 2 with America's Favorite Millionaire, Dani Johnson
 Information About The Secret Millionaire TV Show Premiering 6 March on ABC
 Secret Millionaire 2011

2000s American reality television series
2006 British television series debuts
2008 American television series debuts
2009 Australian television series debuts
2010 Australian television series endings
2010s American reality television series
2000s British reality television series
2010s British reality television series
2011 Irish television series debuts
2012 Irish television series endings
American television series based on British television series
2000s Australian reality television series
2010s Australian reality television series
Channel 4 original programming
English-language television shows
Fox Broadcasting Company original programming
Nine Network original programming
Television series by Banijay
Television series by Rocket Science Laboratories